Hart Creek Conservation Area is a nature preserve in Boone County, Missouri. It is named after Hart Creek, which runs through the area. It is adjacent to the Katy Trail State Park, which runs along its southwestern border. The area is primarily managed forest and limestone bluffs near the Missouri River. It is located near the town of Hartsburg, Missouri.

See also
Three Creeks Township, Boone County, Missouri
Gans Creek Recreation Area

References

External links
Official site
Area map

Conservation Areas of Missouri
Protected areas of Boone County, Missouri
Landforms of Boone County, Missouri